LP3 is the third studio album (or third LP) by Ratatat, released on July 8, 2008. It contains the single "Shiller" originally released on 7" vinyl. The duo experimented with different genres as well as synthesizer patches, percussion instruments, sound effects, and samples. Unlike the albums Ratatat and Classics, LP3 was recorded in a few weeks.

Track listing

iTunes Store Bonus Track
"Mirando (YACHT Remix)" – 2:51
Amazon MP3 Bonus Track
 "Shempi (E*Rock Remix)" – 5:15
Japanese Bonus Tracks
 "Shempi (E*Rock Remix)" – 5:15
"Shempi (Zongamin Remix)" – 3:49
"Falcon Jab (Copy Remix)" – 5:26
"Mirando (Animal Collective Remix)" – 9:57
"Mirando (YACHT Remix)" – 2:51

Charts

Weekly charts

Year-end charts

References

External links
Official Ratatat website

Ratatat albums
2008 albums
XL Recordings albums
Albums produced by E*vax